Beachville is an unincorporated community in Suwannee County, Florida, United States. Beachville is the location of the Beachville Fire Tower

References

Unincorporated communities in Suwannee County, Florida
Unincorporated communities in Florida